Nivaflex is an octavariant alloy important in watchmaking, used primarily for the mainspring. The name was registered as a trademark in 1957 by Reinhard Straumann, a Swiss metallurgist. Nivaflex is "wholly non-magnetic" and displays a very low coefficient of thermal expansion. Its composition is of 45% cobalt, 21% nickel, 18% chromium, 5% iron, 4% tungsten, 4% molybdenum, 1% titanium and 0.2% beryllium; carbon content is less than 0.1 percent of the alloy's weight.

References

Horology
Timekeeping components
Springs (mechanical)
Cobalt alloys
Nickel alloys
Ferroalloys
Chromium alloys
Tungsten alloys
Molybdenum alloys
Titanium alloys
Beryllium alloys
Antiferromagnetic alloys